Perrier's Bounty is a 2009 Irish black comedy crime film set in modern-day Dublin. Described as an "urban western" by its director Ian Fitzgibbon, it stars Brendan Gleeson as the villainous title character, as well as Cillian Murphy and Jim Broadbent as son and father.

Filming was completed in late January 2009, and the film premiered at the 2009 Toronto International Film Festival. It was released in the United Kingdom and Ireland on 26 March 2010.

Plot 

Michael McCrea (Cillian Murphy), a perpetual waster, has passed out during the afternoon. He awakes to find two thugs, Ivan (Michael McElhatton) and Orlando (Don Wycherley), staring at him. They remind him that he owes money to Darren Perrier (Brendan Gleeson), a local crime boss. The debt must be paid that night, or Ivan and Orlando will break two of Michael's bones of his own choice. After they depart, Michael goes downstairs and sees his friend Brenda (Jodie Whittaker) carrying a bouquet of flowers. She informs Michael that her boyfriend, Shamie (Pádraic Delaney), with whom she has a rocky relationship, has given her the flowers by way of apologising for his absenteeism. Michael is uninterested, and leaves the building in pursuit of a loan to pay off his debt.

Michael heads to Delgado's Pool Hall, a nearby snooker bar, in search of a man known as The Mutt (Liam Cunningham), who provides loans. There, Michael's friend Clifford (Domhnall Gleeson) explains that The Mutt was recently thrown out of the bar after assaulting a man who insulted his snooker skills. Leaving the bar, Michael clashes with two clampers (Ned Dennehy and Glenn Speers), who vow to find him and clamp his car later. Michael goes home to find his father, Jim McCrea (Jim Broadbent), waiting outside. Their relationship is not good, and Michael is reluctant to talk. However, Jim reveals that he is dying of cancer and wishes to reconcile. The two go to a pub to drink, but while there, Michael learns of The Mutt's location in another pub. He abandons his father, promising to talk later.

At the next pub, Michael runs into Shamie, who is making out with a girl. Michael is angry and tells Shamie he needs to show Brenda some respect and end their relationship if he wants to pursue other girls. Michael then finds The Mutt, who is drinking with his associate Dinny (Breffni McKenna). He asks The Mutt for a loan, but is refused. Giving up, Michael begins to drink at the bar only to be assaulted by an angry Shamie. Michael overpowers Shamie and demands he break up with Brenda. Storming off, he is stopped by The Mutt, who asks if Michael will join him and Dinny in a burglary. The money earned will pay off Michael's debt, but he won't get it until morning. Michael agrees, and the three head out.

The burglary goes off without a hitch, and The Mutt finds pictures that prove the home owner is cheating on his wife. The trio plan to blackmail him out of €30,000. Michael is dropped off and is assured he will get his €10,000 in the morning. Back at his car, he finds his car clamped. Ivan and Orlando then return and drive their truck full speed into the clamped car. Michael flees the scene and loses them, then returns to his home in search of the pistol he keeps under his bed. However, Brenda has stolen the gun and is contemplating suicide after being dumped by Shamie. She locks Michael out of her apartment just as Ivan and Orlando enter, having predicted that he would come home. They begin to beat Michael with a bat and prepare to break his leg. Before they can do so, Orlando is shot dead by Brenda. Ivan runs away to tell Perrier. While comforting Brenda, Jim enters and, noticing the body, tells them they need to properly dispose of Orlando. The three get into Brenda's car and go to an escarpment, where they bury Orlando. Jim comments that the locale is beautiful and refers to its history, commenting that men who lived and died by the sword were buried here. Brenda's car becomes flooded and they cannot get away, so Michael and Brenda spend the night in her car, while Jim stands outside, spending the whole night awake, watching Dublin.

At Perrier's hideout, he discusses Orlando's death with four other members of his crew. It is revealed to him that Ivan and Orlando were lovers. Perrier goes to comfort the grieving Ivan, telling him that he is not judgemental about his homosexual relationship and that he will be putting a €10,000 bounty on Michael and Brenda.

Back at Brenda's car, it is morning and Michael notices that his father has been up all night. Jim then admits that he does not have cancer, but instead believes he was visited by the Grim Reaper. During his visit, the Reaper informed Jim that the next time he sleeps, he will die. Upset that his father played on his sympathies, Michael wakes Brenda and tells her that her car has to be burned. Once it is aflame, the trio head back into the city. They are caught in a rain storm and take shelter at a farm, but the farm owner (Jane Brennan) calls the police and claims the trio raped her. Having fled down the road, they take cover upon seeing a Garda Síochána patrol car. Once it has passed, they cut through a forest. Brenda vows to make her relationship with Shamie work, and an angry Michael berates her for blindly loving Shamie despite his lack of faithfulness and love for her. While Jim takes him aside, Brenda storms off and, once they notice she is gone, Michael and Jim follow. They catch up with her as she is being arrested by two police officers. While sneaking up on them, Jim snatches Michael's gun and confronts the officers. The trio steal the police car and Michael receives a call from The Mutt, who gives them his location in order for Michael to pick up his share of the blackmail earnings.

With plans to meet The Mutt behind a factory at one in the afternoon, Brenda demands that, in the meantime, she be dropped off at Shamie's so she can try to restore their relationship. Along the way, the trio encounter a young man (Chris Newman) and two of his mates joyriding in a stolen car. Jim and the man talk and the two trios swap cars. In their new stolen car, they arrive at Shamie's; however, Brenda arrives just as a nearly naked woman strolls out and a nearly naked Shamie runs after her. The two start to get intimate in the hallway just as Shamie notices Brenda, but Brenda runs away. Outside the building, Brenda bypasses the car and runs down a nearby street, prompting Michael to chase after her and comfort her. Jim, left behind, approaches Jerome (Brendan Coyle) and Russ (Conleth Hill), two members of the Savage Canine Vernacular, who are training their Rottweilers to attack. Jim helps them, and then picks up Michael and Brenda.

They trio arrive at the warehouse and Michael heads in alone to get his share. He meets with The Mutt and Dinny, but the two plan on betraying him. The Mutt knocks Michael out with a wrench and he and Dinny carry the unconscious Michael to The Mutt's car. As they are putting him in the boot, Jim approaches, armed with a pistol. He knocks both Dinny and The Mutt out while Brenda steals the entire €30,000. With Michael back in the car, the trio head out.

Hiding out in another industrial area, Jim reveals the reason why Michael became estranged from his parents. After witnessing a local thug, Steve Lynch, beating up a woman, Michael intervened and beat up Lynch. Lynch returned to Michael's house later, where only his mother, Elaine, was home. Lynch proceeded to assault Elaine, leaving her badly injured. Believing his parents blamed him for the attack, Michael broke off contact with them. Elaine and Jim would later split up, with Elaine moving to County Clare. Jim then asks Michael if he can have some cocaine, and Michael agrees, taking him to Delgado's Pool Hall in order to buy off of Clifford. However, during the sale, Clifford signals Mulligan, played by the Irish novelist (Patrick McCabe), who calls Perrier. While Jim is snorting coke in the bathroom and Michael and Brenda are talking, Perrier and his goons enter. Michael accidentally fires off his pistol, causing everyone to take cover. Other gang members, primarily Ivan, begin shooting but Brenda, angry at Clifford, beats him over the head and she and Michael use him as a human shield to escape. Clifford is killed in the process, and Jim is left behind. Upon exiting Delgado's, the pair find that their stolen car has been clamped, and are forced to flee on foot. Thankfully, Shamie is able to find them in his car, announcing that he has been looking for Brenda. Michael and Brenda jump into his car.

Outside Delgado's, Perrier and his crew join with The Mutt and Dinny. Jerome and Russ approach, but their dogs growl and Perrier coldly shoots them. Jim walks out of the hall just as the gangs are leaving, but The Mutt notices him and he is taken hostage. Meanwhile, Shamie has tried to reconcile with Brenda, but she refuses him and her and Michael take his car at gunpoint. They take refuge in a hotel. They receive a call from a badly beaten Jim who explains to Michael that he is going to "take a nap" after the phone call - implying, true to his vision, that he will die. Despite this, Michael arms himself and prepares to go to Perrier's hideout. Brenda tries to warn him against it, but the two share a passionate kiss and Michael heads out in Shamie's car.

Michael arrives at Perrier's hideout, with the €30,000 and a pistol hidden in the crotch of his pants. He is informed that his father is going to die that night, though it will be quick. Michael's death, however, will be slow. He is pinned down on the table while Ivan attempts to castrate him. Before it can be done, however, The Mutt asks for his money so he can leave. Perrier pockets the money, just as Hank (Francis Magee) shoots and kills Dinny. In the confusion, Michael is able to escape, and Perrier kills The Mutt. Two of Perrier's cronies pursue Michael, who has acquired a golf club. He uses it first to knock out Blaise (Wuzza Conlon) and then Victor (Brendan Dempsey). Michael, now armed with a pistol, returns and confronts Perrier, Ivan, Hank, and Kenny (Brian Doherty). Lining them up against a wall, Michael takes their guns and his money. Kenny calls his bluff, and is shot in the leg. Michael then pushes his father out of the building and loads him into Shamie's car. At the same time, Perrier reveals that he has an AK-74u hidden under the snooker table. With that in hand, he, Ivan, and Hank head outside to confront Michael, who is attempting to flee. Perrier fires into the car as Michael reverses, and Jim is hit in the chest. They comment on how the Reaper came after all, and Jim calls him a cunt. An enraged Michael charges out of the car at Perrier, firing his gun, wounding Ivan and Hank in the process. Perrier shoots at Michael, severely wounding him. Before Perrier can finish him, multiple vans pull up, brought to the location by Brenda, containing members of the Savage Canine Vernacular. They set their dogs upon Perrier, who is mauled to death. Brenda, Jerome, and Russ inform a semi-conscious Michael that they're taking him to Derek Dawson, the best veterinarian in the business.

The next morning, Michael, having had his wounds treated, and Brenda are at the funeral for Jim, who is buried alongside Russ and Jerome's dogs Achilles and Apollo at the same place that the trio had buried Orlando earlier. A heartfelt eulogy is given, and Michael and Brenda profess their love for each other. The pair then head to County Clare, where Michael intends to reconcile with his mother. The narrator, listed in credits as the Reaper, ponders as to whether the experience has made Michael a better man, possibly an enlightened man. He is shown waving at his mother before the camera fades out.

Cast 

 Gabriel Byrne as Voice of The Reaper
 Cillian Murphy as Michael McCrea
 Michael McElhatton as Ivan
 Don Wycherley as Orlando
 Jodie Whittaker as Brenda
 Brendan Coyle as Jerome
 Conleth Hill as Russ
 Domhnall Gleeson as Clifford
 Patrick McCabe as Mulligan
 Ned Dennehy as Clamper
 Glenn Speers as Clamper 2
 Jim Broadbent as Jim McCrea
 Pádraic Delaney as Shamie
 Natalie Britton as Catherine
 Liam Cunningham as The Mutt
 Breffni McKenna as Dinny
 Brendan Gleeson as Darren Perrier
 Francis Magee as Hank
 Wuzza Conlon as Blaise
 Brendan Dempsey as Victor
 Brian Doherty as Kenny
 Jane Brennan as Farmhouse Battleaxe
 Michael FitzGerald as Garda
 Chris Newman as Teen Joyrider
 Andrew Simpson as Teen 2

Music 
 
Music for the film was created by Belfast musician David Holmes.

Critical response 
 
, Perrier's Bounty holds a 55% approval rating on Rotten Tomatoes based on 44 reviews, with an average rating of 5.60/10. The website's critics consensus reads: "It has interesting characters and a strong cast, but Perrier's Bounty ultimately fails to do anything original with them."

Donald Clarke of The Irish Times gave the film 2/5 stars. Paul Byrne of Movies.ie gave the film 2/5, judging it to be less funny than the film Intermission.

Gary Goldstein of the Los Angeles Times favoured the film, describing it as "A fast-paced and enjoyable if violent diversion that revels in its quirky characters, committed performances and involving twists." Stuart Messham of Maxim wrote "Half comic tour de force and half "urban western", Perrier's Bounty is a 90-minute treat and, in case you hadn't gathered this by now, we recommend it.", awarding the film 5 out of 5 stars.

References

External links 
  Perrier's Bounty at BFI
  Perrier's Bounty at British Council–Film
  Perrier's Bounty at Lumiere
 
 

2009 films
2000s comedy thriller films
2009 black comedy films
2009 comedy films
Films about father–son relationships
Films about kidnapping
Films about murderers
Films directed by Ian Fitzgibbon
Films produced by Elizabeth Karlsen
Films scored by David Holmes (musician)
Films set in Dublin (city)
Irish comedy thriller films
Neo-Western films
Number 9 Films films
English-language Irish films
2000s English-language films